Mount Putnik is a mountain located north of Three Isle Creek and west of the Kananaskis River in Peter Lougheed Provincial Park Alberta, Canada. The mountain is named after the Serbian Field Marshal Radomir Putnik (1847-1917).

In June 2012, the Ravna Gora Serbian Heritage Society of Calgary, Alberta Canada, unveiled a plaque to commemorate Radomir Putnik on the mountain. The plaque text is as follows: 
"Mount Putnik is named in perpetual remembrance of the men and women of the allied armed forces in Serbia and their leader Field Marshal Radomir Putnik (1847-1917). Serbia lost a quarter of its population, both army and civilian, during WWI (1914-1918). This sacrifice was part of Canadian and Allied efforts in Europe against three empires to protect the rights and freedoms of human kind.”

Climate

Based on the Köppen climate classification, it is located in a subarctic climate zone with cold, snowy winters, and mild summers. Precipitation runoff from the mountain drains into tributaries of the Kananaskis River.

See also
List of mountains in the Canadian Rockies

References

External links

 Mount Putnik weather: Mountain Forecast

Alberta's Rockies
Two-thousanders of Alberta
Serbian-Canadian culture